Henning Grenander (4 August 1874–11 March 1958) was a Swedish figure skater.

Grenander was born on 4 August 1874 in Skövde, Sweden. He began attending a school in Stockholm when he was 8 and began learning how to skate when he was 11.

He won a silver medal at the 1893 European Figure Skating Championships but the results were declared invalid by ISU over issues with the scoring rules.

In 1898 he moved to London and worked in a Swedish bank. He won the gold medal at the 1898 World Figure Skating Championships and decided to stay in London after the games. He became a Swedish masseur and became involved with the National Skating Association.

He helped plan the 1908 Summer Olympics and was a judge in the men's singles figure skating and men's special figures events.

He died in a nursing home in Torquay, England on 11 March 1958.

Results

References

 

Swedish male single skaters
1874 births
1958 deaths
World Figure Skating Championships medalists
European Figure Skating Championships medalists
People from Skövde Municipality
Sportspeople from Västra Götaland County